Gołąb or Golab is a Polish-language surname, meaning "dove". It may refer to:

 Maciej Gołąb (born 1952), Polish musicologist
 Marek Gołąb (1940–2017), Polish weightlifter
 Michał Ilków-Gołąb (born 1985), Polish footballer
 Stanisław Gołąb (1902–1980), Polish mathematician
 Zbigniew Gołąb (1923–1994), Polish and American linguist
 Tony Golab (1919–2016), Canadian football player

See also
 
Gollob
Golomb

Polish-language surnames